Malhian is a village in Sialkot District, Punjab, Pakistan.

References 

Villages in Sialkot District